William J. Madigan  (July 18, 1868 – December 4, 1954) was a professional baseball pitcher for the 1886 Washington Nationals of the National League. He played for the Binghamton Crickets in the minors in 1887.

External links

Baseball players from Washington, D.C.
Major League Baseball pitchers
Washington Nationals (1886–1889) players
1868 births
1954 deaths
Binghamton Crickets (1880s) players
19th-century baseball players